In mathematics, the dual Hahn polynomials are a family of orthogonal polynomials in the Askey scheme of hypergeometric orthogonal polynomials. They are defined on a non-uniform lattice  and are defined as

 give a detailed list of their properties.

Orthogonality
The dual Hahn polynomials have the orthogonality condition

Where ,

and

Numerical instability
As the value of  increases, the values that the discrete polynomials obtain also increases. As a result, to obtain numerical stability in calculating the polynomials you would use the renormalized dual Hahn polynomial as defined as

Then the orthogonality condition becomes

for

Relation to other polynomials
Then setting  the Hahn polynomials become the Chebyshev polynomials. Note that the dual Hahn polynomials have a q-analog with an extra parameter q known as the dual q-Hahn polynomials.

Racah polynomials are a generalization of dual Hahn polynomials.

References
 
 
 
 

Special hypergeometric functions
Orthogonal polynomials